William Livingstone, 6th Lord Livingston, (died 1592), was a Scottish lord of Parliament.

Early life
William Livingstone was the son of Alexander Livingston, 5th Lord Livingston (c. 1500–1553) and his second wife, Lady Agnes Douglas, daughter of John Douglas, 2nd Earl of Morton. His father, Alexander, was the guardian of Mary, Queen of Scots, during her childhood.

Life
William became Lord Livingston in 1550, his elder brother John, Master of Livingstone was killed in 1547 at the battle of Pinkie. He was a Protestant. His sister Mary Livingston was one of the four attendants of Mary, Queen of Scots. He fought for Queen Mary at the battle of Langside in 1568.

His wife Agnes Fleming became an attendant of Mary in England. She came to Bolton Castle in August 1568, with two waiting women and eight male servants. She was travelling to Tutbury Castle in January 1569 when she fell ill at Rotherham, and Francis Knollys wrote that Mary "doth esteem (her) most dearly". At Tutbury, the Earl of Shrewsbury wrote that Lady Livingston, Mary Seton, and the queen, worked embroidery with his wife, Bess of Hardwick. Her servants in the household of Mary at Sheffield Castle were Nicol Fisher and her gentlewoman Christian Graham. She was murdered by Mawse Livingstone in 1597.

Personal life
William married Agnes Fleming (1535-1597), a daughter of Lady Janet Stewart (1502–1562) and Malcolm Fleming, 3rd Lord Fleming (c. 1494–1547). Agnes Fleming's sister Janet Fleming had married William's brother, John Master of Livingstone.  William's children included;
Alexander Livingstone, 1st Earl of Linlithgow (died 1621), who married Helenor "Helen" Hay, eldest daughter of Andrew Hay, 8th Earl of Erroll (c. 1531–1585)
George Livingstone of Ogleface
William Livingstone of Westquarter, near Linlithgow
Jean Livingstone, who married Alexander Elphinstone, 4th Lord Elphinstone (1552-1638), the Treasurer of Scotland
Margaret Livingstone, who married Lewis Bellenden and Patrick Stewart, 2nd Earl of Orkney

References

1592 deaths
Lords of Parliament (pre-1707)
William Livingstone, 6th Lord Livingston
Year of birth unknown